Censuses in Ukraine is a sporadic event that since 2001 has been conducted by the State Statistics Committee of Ukraine under the jurisdiction of the Government of Ukraine.

History

The first steps

The first official census in the territory of Ukraine took place in 1818 when Western Ukraine was part of the Austrian Empire. However a modern census did not take place until 1857. Since then the next censuses took place in the dual-power state of the Austria-Hungary in 1869, 1880, 1890, 1900, 1910. Those last five censuses also included the territory of the today Zakarpattia Oblast which was part of the Kingdom of Hungary. The further censuses discontinued as the country fell apart. The rest of Ukraine which was part of Russian Empire conducted its first census as part of the 1897 Russian Census. The next national census in Russia did not take place until after World War I and the formation of the Soviet Union. A city-census of Kyiv took place in March 1919, after the Bolsheviks occupied the city. In 1920, a census was conducted only in those areas of Ukraine that were not involved in the Russian Civil War.

Interwar censuses

The next census conducted in most of the territory of Western Ukraine (Eastern Galicia) was the Polish census of 1921, while the 1921 Czechoslovakia Census took place on the territory of the Zakarpattia Oblast. In 1930 another census took place in both regions as part of their respective national censuses that were conducted in the same year. Also the area of today Chernivtsi Oblast saw its first national census in 1930 for the first time since the last one that was conducted in the Austria-Hungary in 1910, while the area of Budjak of today Odessa Oblast along with the rest of Bessarabia had the Russian demographic statistic data back from 1897. Already during the World War II one more census took place in 1941 in Hungary which previously sacked and occupied the territory of Carpatho-Ukraine (today Zakarpattia Oblast). As it was mentioned before, the first national Russian Census since 1897 took place only in 1926 as part of the First All-Union Census in the USSR. The next census in the Soviet Union took place in 1937, but it was recognized as unofficial and was never disclosed. The census was also recognized as a conspiracy against the Soviet regime. Just before the World War II in 1939, the Soviet Union conducted another census that was accepted as the official one.

Post-War censuses
After  World War II, Ukraine was united in its current borders (including Crimea) and within the Soviet Union. The first Soviet Census after the war took place in 1959, followed by three more in 1970, 1979 and 1989. The next planned census never took place as the Soviet Union dissolved in 1991.

Post-Soviet

The first (and so far only) national census of Ukraine took place in 2001. It was originally planned that the next one would follow in 2010, but it was postponed until 2020. In April 2020 Minister of the Cabinet of Ministers Oleh Nemchinov said there would be no census in 2020 and probably not in 2021. Nemchinov said in December 2020 that the next census was planned for 2023.

Summary

Western Ukraine under Poland, 1921–1931

References

External links
 Historical information on the website of the Ukrainian Census
 Official website of the Ukrainian Census
 2001 Census of Ukraine
 List of all censuses of the Russian Empire, Soviet Union and Russian Federation at "Demoscope Weekly". Demography Institute of the National Research University "The Highest School of Economics"

 
Demographics of Ukraine
Ukraine